Terez Hall (born November 18, 1996) is an American football outside linebacker for the New England Patriots of the National Football League (NFL). He played college football at Missouri.

College career
Hall was a member of the Missouri Tigers for four seasons. As a junior, he finished second on the team with 85 tackles and 12.5 tackles for loss with one sack. Hall was named a team captain going into his senior season and ended the year with 74 tackles, nine tackles for loss, five sacks, seven quarterback hurries and one interception. Hall finished his collegiate career with 186 tackles, six sacks, an interception and a forced fumble in 48 games played.

Professional career 
Hall was signed by the New England Patriots as an undrafted free agent on April 27, 2019. He was waived on August 31, 2019, during final roster cuts and was re-signed to the team's practice squad the following day. Hall remained on the practice squad for the remainder of the season and signed a reserve/futures contract with the Patriots on January 6, 2020.

Hall was waived during final roster cuts on September 5, 2020, but was again re-signed to the practice squad the next day. He was elevated to the active roster on November 9, 2020, and made his debut that night on Monday Night Football, starting at linebacker and making six total tackles in a 30–27 win over the New York Jets. He reverted to the practice squad after the game. He was elevated again on November 14 for the team's week 10 game against the Baltimore Ravens, and reverted to the practice squad again following the game. He was promoted to the active roster on November 21.

Hall was placed on the reserve/physically unable to perform list to start the 2021 season.

On May 5, 2022, Terez Hall was released by the New England Patriots after a failed physical. He was re-signed to the practice squad on December 20, 2022. He signed a reserve/future contract on January 10, 2023.

References

External links
Missouri Tigers bio
New England Patriots bio

1996 births
Living people
American football linebackers
Missouri Tigers football players
New England Patriots players
People from Lithonia, Georgia
Players of American football from Georgia (U.S. state)
Sportspeople from DeKalb County, Georgia